Cobblestone House or Cobblestone Farmhouse can refer to:

 Cobblestone House (Eau Claire, Wisconsin)
 Cobblestone House (Bath, New York)
 Cobblestone House (Cazenovia, New York)
Cobblestone Farmhouse at 1229 Birdsey Road, Junius, New York
Cobblestone Farmhouse at 1027 Stone Church Road, Junius, New York
Cobblestone Farmhouse at 1111 Stone Church Road, Junius, New York

See also
List of cobblestone buildings
John Graves Cobblestone Farmhouse, Junius, New York
Cobblestone Historic District, Childs, New York
Cobblestone architecture
Stone House (disambiguation)